Idrætsforeningen Midtdjurs Fodbold, also known as IF Midtdjurs, is an association football club based in Ryomgård, Djursland Denmark, that competes in the Series 3, the eight tier of the Danish football league system and the fourth tier of the regional DBU Jutland governing body. 

The club was established in 1972 as a merger between Ryomgård Idrætsforening og Nimtofte Gymnastikforening.

The club most famously had Martin Jørgensen as a youth player during the 1980s, who would later have a prolific career in AGF, Udinese and Fiorentina. Other former players include Mads Jørgensen, Dennis Høegh and Rasmus Grønborg Hansen.

References

External links
 Official site

IF Midtdjurs
Football clubs in Denmark
Association football clubs established in 1972
1972 establishments in Denmark